Paper Heart or Paper Hearts may refer to:

Paper Heart (film), a 2009 romantic comedy film
Paper Heart, a 2013 album by Chlöe Howl
"Paper Heart", its title track, released as a single
"Paper Heart", a 2011 song by Stealing Angels
"Paper Hearts", the tenth episode of the fourth season of the science fiction television series The X-Files
The Paper Hearts, an American rock band
"Paper Hearts" (song), a 2017 song by The Vamps